The Ў Gallery (Y Gallery) ( - Gallery Short U) was an art gallery of contemporary art located in Minsk, the capital of Belarus. The Gallery Ў consised of the exhibition space, wine bar Ў, design-shop and Literary House Logvinov.

History 
The gallery was opened in October 2009.

In 2010 the gallery launched the project START. The projects' aim is to promote young Belarusian artists by organizing their solo exhibitions and public discussions.

Since the opening, the gallery has hosted more than 120 various exhibitions and expositions in gallery's building. Most of them are group and solo exhibitions of Belarusian artists. Also, the Ў Gallery has held 14 exhibitions abroad in such places as Vilnius (Lithuania), Poznan (Poland), Lublin (Poland), Moscow (Russia), and Stockholm (Sweden).

In 2020, the co-owner and creator of the gallery, Aliaksandr Vasilievič, became a political prisoner. He and his partners sold their stakes in the gallery (and the bar associated with it), but not the Ў gallery and Ў bar brands. The new owners decided to develop the space under the name Вершы (Vieršy, literally 'poems').

Origin of the name 
The gallery's name derives from the Belarusian character «Ў», which distinguishes the Belarusian alphabet from other alphabets in the East Slavic group.

Sales of works 
In the gallery, there was an opportunity to buy various types of pictures and sculptures by modern Belarusian artists.

Awards 
The Y Gallery won the "Best Foreign Gallery award on the annual art fair ArtVilnius in 2011 and 2016.

References

External links 
  

Buildings and structures in Minsk
Art museums and galleries in Belarus